Superhero Kindergarten (also known as Stan Lee's Superhero Kindergarten), is a superhero streaming television series starring Arnold Schwarzenegger and Desiree Burch. The series is created by Stan Lee, Arnold Schwarzenegger and Andy Heyward and co-produced by Genius Brands, POW! Entertainment, Oak Productions and Telegael Teoranta. Superhero Kindergarten premiered on April 23, 2021, on Genius Brands' streaming service Kartoon Channel. The series was renewed for a second season.

Premise
A former gym teacher turned superhero, Captain Fantastic, lost his superpowers in  a battle with his nemesis, Dr. Superior. During this air battle, his superpower particles were transferred to six babies who were below. Five years later, the powerless Captain Fantastic, now known as Mr. Arnold, is called on to work 'undercover' as a kindergarten teacher to raise a new generation of super-powered kids.

Cast
 Arnold Schwarzenegger as Arnold Armstrong / Captain Fantastic
 Desiree Burch as Principal Shoutzalot
 Shelley Longworth as Billy / Blocker
 Penelope Rawlins as Jackson Jet
 Rae Lim as Lin / Cray-Cray
 Nneka Okoye as Patty Putty
 Jules De Jongh as Power Pedro
 Shash Hira as Vik / Sticky
 Dan Russell as Nigel Danforth / Dr. Superior and Mr. O
 Adam Diggle as Stan Lee

Production and development
In May 2019, production began on the series, after Arnold Schwarzenegger was cast in the lead role as Arnold Armstrong / Captain Fantastic. He served as a co-executive producer with Paul Wachter, CEO of Main Street Advisors and Fabian Nicieza, who was also the developer of the series. On June 15, 2020, Amazon Prime Video acquired the series. On June 20, 2020, John Landis signed on to direct and executive produce all of the episodes. The season was to consist of 52 episodes.

In July 2020, Genius Brands and Archie Comics published the late Stan Lee's comic book Superhero Kindergarten, in a multi-year partnership agreement. As with other adaptations of his works, Lee made several cameo appearances in the series. The series was the last project Lee personally worked on. Discussing his work on the series, lead actor Arnold Schwarzenegger said, "Superhero Kindergarten is near and dear to my heart, the greatest superhero to ever live. What an honor it was to collaborate with Stan Lee on the creation of the series, and I am absolutely thrilled that our new series has resonated so strongly with audiences right out of the gate". In 2021, Steven Banks was revealed to have served as a writer on the series.

During an April 2021 interview on Jimmy Kimmel Live!, Schwarzenegger stated that the idea behind the making of Superhero Kindergarten came from his desire "to do a sequel to Kindergarten Cop". Schwarzenegger reiterated this in a May 2021 interview on The Kelly Clarkson Show, while adding that Stan Lee told him "[he had] an idea for an animated show. What about Superhero Kindergarten, where you're a kindergarten teacher for kids who have superpowers? You have been a superhero yourself (in the show) but you're now retired and teaching those kids how to be good contributors and how to save the world in the future".

Episodes

Release
The first two episodes of Superhero Kindergarten were released on the Kartoon Channel on April 23, 2021, with subsequent episodes to be released weekly. The first episode premiered on January 29, 2021, which included an introduction from series star, Arnold Schwarzenegger.

Reception

Critical response
Alessia Santoro, of PopSugar, gave a positive review, saying "it's the perfect show for superhero-loving parents and their kids to enjoy together".

Ratings
The first two episodes were watched by over 2 million viewerm with an average watch time of 6 minutes. By May 3, 2021, the first three episodes surpassed 9 million views. Andy Heyward, chairman and CEO of Genius Brands, discussed the episodes' ratings, by saying "this breaks every record for us on the channel and goes beyond our wildest expectation for the series weekend debut. In the new world of streaming media, it's hard to compare apples to oranges, but if Superhero Kindergarten were a feature movie, we would be doing cartwheels with this 'opening weekend box office'".
Average watch time perview 6 minutes.  According to andys press release giving hours watched updates.

References

External links
 
 
 

2020s American animated television series
2020s American school television series
2021 American television series debuts
Amazon Prime Video original programming
American children's animated action television series
American children's animated adventure television series
American children's animated comedy television series
American children's animated fantasy television series
American children's animated superhero television series
American flash animated television series
Animated television series about children
Animated television series by Amazon Studios
Cultural depictions of Arnold Schwarzenegger
Elementary school television series
English-language television shows
Superhero schools
Television series about educators
Anime-influenced Western animated television series
Television shows based on Archie Comics
Television shows based on works by Stan Lee